Bagras or Baghrās, ancient Pagrae, is a town and its nearby castle in the İskenderun district of Turkey, in the Amanus Mountains.

Strabo's Geographica mentions it as being on the borders of Gindarus, "a natural stronghold" leading to the Amanian Gate or Amanides Pylae over the Amanus Mountains.

Castle's History

The castle of Pagrae was erected c. 965 by the Byzantine emperor Nikephoros II Phokas, who stationed there 1000 footmen and 500 horsemen under the command of Michael Bourtzes to raid the countryside of the nearby city of Antioch. The castle provided a base for a force to cover the Amanian Gate. It was built in two levels around a knoll, the fortification resembling Armenian work, and with water supplied by aqueducts.

It was then rebuilt about 1153 by the Knights Templar under the name Gaston (also Gastun, Guascon, Gastim) and held by them or by the Principality of Antioch until it was forced to capitulate to Saladin on 26 August 1189. It was retaken in 1191 by the Armenians (under Leo II), and their possession of it became a major point of contention between them and the Antiochenes and Templars.

After much negotiation, it was finally returned to the Templars in 1216. According to the Armenian chronicles, it withstood a siege by the forces of Aleppo at about this time. After the fall of Antioch to Baibars in 1268, the garrison lost heart, and one of the brothers deserted and presented the keys of the castle to him. The remaining defenders decided to destroy what they could and surrender the castle. Despite the loss of the castle, Hethum II, King of Armenia and Leo IV, King of Armenia soundly defeated a Mamluk raiding force in the nearby pass in 1305.

The first detailed historical and archaeological evaluation, including a surveyed plan of the entire complex, was completed in 1979 by R. W. Edwards.  The fortification has more than thirty chambers which encompass the steep outcrop on three primary levels.  Although the site initially had phases of Arab and Byzantine construction, most of the exterior masonry is from the Frankish occupations.  Repairs to the towers and walls were made by the Armenians with their distinctive masonry during brief periods of control.  Bağras was never integrated into the complex defensive system that the Armenians built along the Taurus and Anti-Taurus Mountains of Cilicia from the 12th through the 14th centuries.

External links
 Picture of Bagras today
 Gaston castle at Forteresses d'Orient
 Extensive photographic survey and plan of Bağras Castle

References

Towns in Turkey
Crusader castles
Castles and fortifications of the Knights Templar
Buildings and structures in Hatay Province
İskenderun
Antakya
Byzantine fortifications in Turkey
10th-century fortifications